The moth family Lasiocampidae contains the following genera:

References 

Lasiocampidae
Lasiocampidae